Expedition 23 was the 23rd long-duration mission to the International Space Station (ISS). Expedition 23 began with the Soyuz TMA-16 undocking on 18 March 2010. Shortly thereafter cosmonauts Aleksandr Skvortsov and Mikhail Korniyenko and astronaut Tracy Caldwell Dyson arrived at the Space Station on Soyuz TMA-18 on 4 April 2010. The Soyuz spacecraft lifted off from the Baikonur Cosmodrome at 00:04 EST on 2 April 2010.

Crew

Source NASA

Backup crew 
Douglas H. Wheelock - Commander
Anton Shkaplerov
Satoshi Furukawa
Mikhail Tyurin
Aleksandr Samokutyayev
Scott J. Kelly

Mission overview
Three Russian cosmonauts, two American and one Japanese astronauts made up the Expedition 23 crew. It was the first ISS crew to include three Russians at once. The Expedition 23 crew continued outfitting the newest modules of the nearly completed space station. The crew welcomed the shuttle flight STS-131 in April 2010. The Expedition 23 crew also saw the arrival of the Rasvet Russian docking module (MRM1) aboard  on STS-132, which launched on 14 May 2010.

Gallery

References

External links

NASA's Space Station Expeditions page
Expedition 23 photography

Expeditions to the International Space Station
2010 in spaceflight